Mats Ronander (born 27 December 1986), better known by his stage name Funkin Matt, is a Norwegian record producer, remixer and DJ.

Ronander is best known for his remix of Mariah Carey's "You're Mine (Eternal)", with fellow producer Gregor Salto, which reached #1 on Billboards Dance Club Chart in 2014.

Career

In 2007 Ronander released his first EP "Shake It Don't Break It" on Sidney Samson's label Samsobeats. In 2012 Funkin Matt came in touch with Fool's Gold Records boss A-Trak and went on to releasing "I Wish" on the Brooklyn based label. This caught the attention of Tiesto which reached out to Ronander, prompting him to later release the "Alive" EP on Tiesto's Musical Freedom.

Later in 2012, Ronander started working with US label Mad Decent, run by Diplo. He went on to release "Rapture" and "MAD" on the same label, the latter of which was featured in Ubisofts video game "The Crew". He also did guest mixes for both Diplo and Tiesto on their respective BBC Radio 1 radio shows.

In 2017 he signed tracks to Spinnin' Records, and released the tracks "Phoenix" on Spinnin' Deep and
"Aurora" on Oliver Heldens' sub label Heldeep Records.

Discography

Singles and extended plays

Remixes

References

External links
 

1986 births
Norwegian dance musicians
Norwegian DJs
Norwegian record producers
Living people
Musicians from Tønsberg
Remixers
Future house musicians
Dim Mak Records artists
Electronic dance music DJs